Norbert Kückelmann (1 May 1930 – 31 August 2017) was a German film director, screenwriter and lawyer. He was born in Munich, During the 1950s he studied law and worked part-time as a film critic. After graduation, he worked as a lawyer in Munich and Mainz. In 1965 he founded together with Alexander Kluge and Hans-Rolf Strobel the Young German Film Committee (. Continuing to work as a lawyer he directed his first film Die Sachverständigen in 1973. At the 23rd Berlin International Film Festival the film won a Silver Bear. His first film also won the Deutscher Filmpreis - Best Feature Film. At the 34th Berlin International Film Festival, his film Man Under Suspicion also won a Silver Bear. Two years later, he was a member of the jury at the 36th Berlin International Film Festival.

Norbert Kückelmann was the brother of the actress Gertrud Kückelmann.

Filmography
 The Experts (Die Sachverständigen) - 1973
 Fear Is a Second Shadow (Die Angst ist ein zweiter Schatten) - 1974
  - 1979
 Man Under Suspicion (Morgen in Alabama) - 1984
  - 1989
 Abgetrieben - 1992
 Alle haben geschwiegen - 1996 
 Porträt eines Richters - 1997
 Verlorene Kinder - 2000
 Ich hab es nicht gewollt - Anatomie eines Mordfalls - 2002

References

External links
 

1930 births
2017 deaths
German television directors
Film directors from Munich